North America is a continent in the Northern Hemisphere and almost entirely within the Western Hemisphere. It is bordered to the north by the Arctic Ocean, to the east by the Atlantic Ocean, to the southeast by South America and the Caribbean Sea, and to the west and south by the Pacific Ocean. Because it is on the North American Tectonic Plate, Greenland is included as a part of North America geographically.

North America is the third-largest continent by area, following Asia and Africa, and the fourth by population after Asia, Africa, and Europe. In 2013, its population was estimated at nearly 579 million people in 23 independent states, or about 7.5% of the world's population. In human geography and in the English-speaking world outside the United States, particularly in Canada, "North America" and "North American" can refer to just Canada and the United States together.

North America was reached by its first human populations during the Last Glacial Period, via crossing the Bering land bridge approximately 20,000 to 17,000 years ago. The so-called Paleo-Indian period is taken to have lasted until about 10,000 years ago (the beginning of the Archaic or Meso-Indian period). The classic stage spans roughly the 6th to 13th centuries. The first recorded Europeans to visit North America (other than Greenland) were the Norse around 1000 AD. Christopher Columbus's arrival in 1492 sparked a transatlantic exchange which included migrations of European settlers during the Age of Discovery and the early modern period. Present-day cultural and ethnic patterns reflect interactions between European colonists, indigenous peoples, African slaves, immigrants from Europe, Asia, and the descendants of these groups.

Owing to Europe's colonization of the Americas, most North Americans speak European languages such as English, Spanish or French, and their cultures commonly reflect Western traditions. However, in parts of Canada, the United States, Mexico, and Central America, there are indigenous populations continuing their cultural traditions and speaking native languages.

Name 

The Americas are usually accepted as having been named after the Italian explorer Amerigo Vespucci by the German cartographers Martin Waldseemüller and Matthias Ringmann. Vespucci, who explored South America between 1497 and 1502, was the first European to suggest that the Americas were not the East Indies, but a different landmass previously unknown by Europeans. In 1507, Waldseemüller produced a world map, in which he placed the word "America" on the continent of South America. What was known about the continent was referred to as Parias above what is today Mexico. On a 1553 world map published by Petrus Apianus, North America was called Baccalearum, meaning "realm of the Cod fish", in reference to the abundance of Cod fish on the east coast.

Waldseemüller used the Latinized version of Vespucci's name (Americus Vespucius), but in its feminine form "America", following the examples of "Europa", "Asia" and "Africa". Later mapmakers extended the name America to the northern continent. In 1538, Gerard Mercator used America on his map of the world for the entire Western Hemisphere.

Gerardus Mercator on his map called North America "America or New India" (America sive India Nova). The Spanish Empire called its territories in North and South America "Las Indias"; the state body overseeing them was the Council of the Indies.

Extent 

The United Nations formally recognizes "North America" as comprising three areas: Northern America, Central America, and the Caribbean. This has been formally defined by the UN Statistics Division.

"Northern America", as a term distinct from "North America", excludes Central America, which itself may or may not include Mexico. In the limited context of the North American Free Trade Agreement  (NAFTA), the term covers Canada, the United States, and Mexico, which are the three signatories of that treaty.

France, Italy, Portugal, Spain, Romania, Greece, and the countries of Latin America use a six-continent model, with the Americas viewed as a single continent and North America designating a subcontinent comprising Canada, the U.S., Mexico, and Saint Pierre et Miquelon (politically part of France), and often Greenland, and Bermuda.

North America has been historically referred to by other names. Spanish North America (New Spain) was often referred to as Northern America, and this was the first official name given to Mexico.

Regions

Geographically, the North American continent has many regions and subregions. These include cultural, economic, and geographic regions. Economic regions included those formed by trade blocs, such as those of the NAFTA and Central American Free Trade Agreement (CAFTA). Linguistically and culturally, the continent could be divided into Anglo-America and Latin America. Anglo-America includes most of Northern America, Belize, and Caribbean islands with English-speaking populations (though sub-national entities, such as Louisiana and Quebec, have large Francophone populations; in Quebec, French is the sole official language).

The southern part of the North American continent is composed of two regions. These are Central America and the Caribbean. The north of the continent maintains recognized regions as well. In contrast to the common definition of "North America", which encompasses the whole continent, the term "North America" is sometimes used to refer only to Mexico, Canada, the U.S., and Greenland.

The term Northern America refers to the northernmost countries and territories of North America: the U.S., Bermuda, St. Pierre and Miquelon, Canada, and Greenland. Although the term does not refer to a unified region, Middle America—not to be confused with the Midwestern U.S.—groups the regions of Mexico, Central America, and the Caribbean.

North America's largest countries by land area, Canada and the U.S., also have well-defined and recognized regions. In the case of Canada, these are (from east to west) Atlantic Canada, Central Canada, Canadian Prairies, the British Columbia Coast, and Northern Canada. These regions also contain many subregions. In the case of the U.S.—and in accordance with the U.S. Census Bureau definitions—these regions are: New England, Mid-Atlantic, South Atlantic states, East North Central states, West North Central states, East South Central states, West South Central states, Mountain states, and Pacific states. Regions shared between both nations include the Great Lakes region. Megalopolises have formed between both nations in the case of the Pacific Northwest and the Great Lakes Megaregion.

Countries, dependencies, and other territories

Natural characteristics

Geography 

North America occupies the northern portion of the landmass generally referred to as the New World, the Western Hemisphere, the Americas, or simply America (which, in many countries is considered as a single continent with North America a subcontinent). North America is the third-largest continent by area, following Asia and Africa. North America's only land connection to South America is at the Isthmus of Darian/Isthmus of Panama. The continent is delimited on the southeast by most geographers at the Darién watershed along the Colombia-Panama border, placing almost all of Panama within North America. Alternatively, some geologists physiographically locate its southern limit at the Isthmus of Tehuantepec, Mexico, with Central America extending southeastward to South America from this point. The Caribbean islands, or West Indies, are considered part of North America. The continental coastline is long and irregular. The Gulf of Mexico is the largest body of water indenting the continent, followed by Hudson Bay. Others include the Gulf of Saint Lawrence and the Gulf of California.

Before the Central American isthmus formed, the region had been underwater. The islands of the West Indies delineate a submerged former land bridge, which had connected North and South America via what are now Florida and Venezuela.

There are numerous islands off the continent's coasts; principally, the Arctic Archipelago, the Bahamas, Turks & Caicos, the Greater and Lesser Antilles, the Aleutian Islands (some of which are in the Eastern Hemisphere proper), the Alexander Archipelago, the many thousand islands of the British Columbia Coast, and Newfoundland. Greenland, a self-governing Danish island, and the world's largest, is on the same tectonic plate (the North American Plate) and is part of North America geographically. In a geologic sense, Bermuda is not part of the Americas, but an oceanic island that was formed on the fissure of the Mid-Atlantic Ridge over 100 million years ago (mya). The nearest landmass to it is Cape Hatteras, North Carolina. However, Bermuda is often thought of as part of North America, especially given its historical, political and cultural ties to Virginia and other parts of the continent.

The vast majority of North America is on the North American Plate. Parts of western Mexico, including Baja California, and of California, including the cities of San Diego, Los Angeles, and Santa Cruz, lie on the eastern edge of the Pacific Plate, with the two plates meeting along the San Andreas fault. The southernmost portion of the continent and much of the West Indies lie on the Caribbean Plate, whereas the Juan de Fuca and Cocos plates border the North American Plate on its western frontier.

The continent can be divided into four great regions (each of which contains many subregions): the Great Plains stretching from the Gulf of Mexico to the Canadian Arctic; the geologically young, mountainous west, including the Rocky Mountains, the Great Basin, California and Alaska; the raised but relatively flat plateau of the Canadian Shield in the northeast; and the varied eastern region, which includes the Appalachian Mountains, the coastal plain along the Atlantic seaboard, and the Florida peninsula. Mexico, with its long plateaus and cordilleras, falls largely in the western region, although the eastern coastal plain does extend south along the Gulf.

The western mountains are split in the middle into the main range of the Rockies and the coast ranges in California, Oregon, Washington, and British Columbia, with the Great Basin—a lower area containing smaller ranges and low-lying deserts—in between. The highest peak is Denali in Alaska.

The USGS further states that "No marked or monumented point has been established by any government agency as the geographic center of either the 50 states, the conterminous United States, or the North American continent." Nonetheless, there is a  field stone obelisk in Rugby claiming to mark the center.

Geology

Geologic history 

Laurentia is an ancient craton which forms the geologic core of North America; it formed between 1.5 and 1.0 billion years ago during the Proterozoic eon. The Canadian Shield is the largest exposure of this craton. From the Late Paleozoic to Early Mesozoic eras, North America was joined with the other modern-day continents as part of the supercontinent Pangaea, with Eurasia to its east. One of the results of the formation of Pangaea was the Appalachian Mountains, which formed some 480 mya, making it among the oldest mountain ranges in the world. When Pangaea began to rift around 200 mya, North America became part of Laurasia, before it separated from Eurasia as its own continent during the mid-Cretaceous period. The Rockies and other western mountain ranges began forming around this time from a period of mountain building called the Laramide orogeny, between 80 and 55 mya. The formation of the Isthmus of Panama that connected the continent to South America arguably occurred approximately 12 to 15 mya, and the Great Lakes (as well as many other northern freshwater lakes and rivers) were carved by receding glaciers about 10,000 years ago.

North America is the source of much of what humanity knows about geologic time periods. The geographic area that would later become the United States has been the source of more varieties of dinosaurs than any other modern country. According to paleontologist Peter Dodson, this is primarily due to stratigraphy, climate and geography, human resources, and history. Much of the Mesozoic Era is represented by exposed outcrops in the many arid regions of the continent. The most significant Late Jurassic dinosaur-bearing fossil deposit in North America is the Morrison Formation of the western U.S.

Canada 

Geologically, Canada is one of the oldest regions in the world, with more than half of the region consisting of Precambrian rocks that have been above sea level since the beginning of the Palaeozoic era. Canada's mineral resources are diverse and extensive. Across the Canadian Shield and in the north there are large iron, nickel, zinc, copper, gold, lead, molybdenum, and uranium reserves. Large diamond concentrations have been recently developed in the Arctic, making Canada one of the world's largest producers. Throughout the Shield, there are many mining towns extracting these minerals. The largest, and best known, is Sudbury, Ontario. Sudbury is an exception to the normal process of forming minerals in the Shield since there is significant evidence that the Sudbury Basin is an ancient meteorite impact crater. The nearby, but less known Temagami Magnetic Anomaly has striking similarities to the Sudbury Basin. Its magnetic anomalies are very similar to the Sudbury Basin, and so it could be a second metal-rich impact crater. The Shield is also covered by vast boreal forests that support an important logging industry.

United States 
The lower 48 U.S. states can be divided into roughly five physiographic provinces:
 The American cordillera
 The Canadian Shield Northern portion of the upper midwestern U.S.
 The stable platform
 The coastal plain
 The Appalachian orogenic belt

The geology of Alaska is typical of that of the cordillera, while the major islands of Hawaii consist of Neogene volcanics erupted over a hot spot.

Central America 

Central America is geologically active with volcanic eruptions and earthquakes occurring from time to time. In 1976 Guatemala was hit by a major earthquake, killing 23,000 people; Managua, the capital of Nicaragua, was devastated by earthquakes in 1931 and 1972, the last one killing about 5,000 people; three earthquakes devastated El Salvador, one in 1986 and two in 2001; one earthquake devastated northern and central Costa Rica in 2009, killing at least 34 people; in Honduras a powerful earthquake killed seven people in 2009.

Volcanic eruptions are common in the region. In 1968 the Arenal Volcano, in Costa Rica, erupted and killed 87 people. Fertile soils from weathered volcanic lavas have made it possible to sustain dense populations in agriculturally productive highland areas.

Central America has many mountain ranges; the longest are the Sierra Madre de Chiapas, the Cordillera Isabelia, and the Cordillera de Talamanca. Between the mountain ranges lie fertile valleys that are suitable for the people; in fact, most of the population of Honduras, Costa Rica, and Guatemala live in valleys. Valleys are also suitable for the production of coffee, beans, and other crops.

Climate 

North America is a very large continent that extends from north of the Arctic Circle to south of the Tropic of Cancer. This tundra radiates throughout Canada, but its border ends near the Rocky Mountains (but still contains Alaska) and at the end of the Canadian Shield, near the Great Lakes.
Climate west of the Cascade Range is described as being temperate weather with average precipitation .

Stretching from the East Coast to eastern North Dakota, and stretching down to Kansas, is the humid continental climate featuring intense seasons, with a large amount of annual precipitation, with places like New York City averaging .
Starting at the southern border of the humid continental climate and stretching to the Gulf of Mexico (whilst encompassing the eastern half of Texas) is the humid subtropical climate. This area has the wettest cities in the contiguous U.S., with annual precipitation reaching  in Mobile, Alabama.
Stretching from the borders of the humid continental and subtropical climates, and going west to the Sierra Nevada, south to the southern tip of Durango, north to the border with tundra climate, the steppe/desert climates are the driest in the United States. Highland climates cut from north to south of the continent, where subtropical or temperate climates occur just below the tropics, as in central Mexico and Guatemala. Tropical climates appear in the island regions and in the subcontinent's bottleneck. Precipitation patterns vary across the region, and as such rainforest, monsoon, and savanna types can be found, with rains and high temperatures throughout the year. Found in countries and states bathed by the Caribbean Sea or to the south of the Gulf of Mexico and the Pacific Ocean.

Ecology 

Notable North American fauna include the bison, black bear, jaguar, cougar, prairie dog, turkey, pronghorn, raccoon, coyote and monarch butterfly.

Notable plants that were domesticated in North America include tobacco, maize, squash, tomato, sunflower, blueberry, avocado, cotton, chile pepper
and vanilla.

History

Pre-Columbian 

The indigenous peoples of the Americas have many creation myths by which they assert that they have been present on the land since its creation, but there is no evidence that humans evolved there. The specifics of the initial settlement of the Americas by ancient Asians are subject to ongoing research and discussion. The traditional theory has been that hunters entered the Bering Land Bridge between eastern Siberia and present-day Alaska from 27,000 to 14,000 years ago. A growing viewpoint is that the first American inhabitants sailed from Beringia some 13,000 years ago, with widespread habitation of the Americas during the end of the Last Glacial Period, in what is known as the Late Glacial Maximum, around 12,500 years ago. The oldest petroglyphs in North America date from 15,000 to 10,000 years before present. Genetic research and anthropology indicate additional waves of migration from Asia via the Bering Strait during the Early-Middle Holocene.

Before contact with Europeans, the natives of North America were divided into many different polities, from small bands of a few families to large empires. They lived in several "culture areas", which roughly correspond to geographic and biological zones and give a good indication of the main way of life of the people who lived there (e.g., the bison hunters of the Great Plains, or the farmers of Mesoamerica). Native groups can also be classified by their language family (e.g., Athapascan or ). Peoples with similar languages did not always share the same material culture, nor were they always allies. Anthropologists think that the Inuit of the high Arctic came to North America much later than other native groups, as evidenced by the disappearance of Dorset culture artifacts from the archaeological record, and their replacement by the Thule people.

During the thousands of years of native habitation on the continent, cultures changed and shifted. One of the oldest yet discovered is the Clovis culture (c. 9550–9050 BCE) in modern New Mexico. Later groups include the Mississippian culture and related Mound building cultures, found in the Mississippi river valley and the Pueblo culture of what is now the Four Corners. The more southern cultural groups of North America were responsible for the domestication of many common crops now used around the world, such as tomatoes, squash, and maize. As a result of the development of agriculture in the south, many other cultural advances were made there. The Mayans developed a writing system, built huge pyramids and temples, had a complex calendar, and developed the concept of zero around 400 CE.

The first recorded European references to North America are in Norse sagas where it is referred to as Vinland. The earliest verifiable instance of pre-Columbian trans-oceanic contact by any European culture with the North America mainland has been dated to around 1000 CE. The site, situated at the northernmost extent of the island named Newfoundland, has provided unmistakable evidence of Norse settlement. Norse explorer Leif Erikson (c. 970–1020 CE) is thought to have visited the area. Erikson was the first European to make landfall on the continent (excluding Greenland).

The Mayan culture was still present in southern Mexico and Guatemala when the Spanish conquistadors arrived, but political dominance in the area had shifted to the Aztec Empire, whose capital city Tenochtitlan was located further north in the Valley of Mexico. The Aztecs were conquered in 1521 by Hernán Cortés.

Post-contact, 1492–1910 

During the so-called Age of Discovery, Europeans explored overseas and staked claims to various parts of North America, much of which was already settled by indigenous peoples. Upon Europeans' arrival in the "New World", indigenous peoples had a variety of reactions, including curiosity, trading, cooperation, resignation, and resistance. The indigenous population declined substantially following European arrival, primarily due to the introduction of Eurasian diseases, such as smallpox, to which the indigenous peoples lacked immunity, and because of violent conflicts with Europeans. Indigenous culture changed significantly and their affiliation with political and cultural groups also changed. Several linguistic groups died out, and others changed quite quickly.

On the southern eastcoast of North America, Spanish explorer Juan Ponce de León, who had accompanied Columbus's second voyage, visited and named in 1513 La Florida. As the colonial period unfolded, Spain, England, and France appropriated and claimed extensive territories in North America eastern and southern coastlines. Spain established permanent settlements on the Caribbean islands of Hispaniola and Cuba in the 1490s, building cities, putting the resident indigenous populations to work, raising crops for Spanish settlers and panning gold to enrich the Spaniards. Much of the indigenous population died due to disease and overwork, spurring the Spaniards on the claim new lands and peoples. An expedition under the command of Spanish settler, Hernán Cortés, sailed westward in 1519 to what turned out to be the mainland in Mexico. With local indigenous allies, the Spanish conquered the Aztec empire in central Mexico in 1521. Spain then established permanent cities in Mexico, Central America, and Spanish South America in the sixteenth century. Once Spaniards conquered the high civilization of the Aztecs and Incas, the Caribbean was a backwater of the Spanish empire.

Other European powers began to intrude on areas that Spain had claimed, including the Caribbean islands. France took the western half of Hispaniola and developed Saint-Domingue as a cane sugar producing colony worked by black slave labor. Britain took Barbados and Jamaica; the Dutch and Danes also took islands previous claimed by Spain. Britain did not begin settling on the North American mainland until a hundred years after the first Spanish settlements, since it sought first to control nearby Ireland. The first permanent English settlement was in Jamestown, Virginia in 1607, and then further settler colonial establishments on the east coast of the continent from is now Georgia up to Massachusetts, forming the Thirteen Colonies. The English did not establish settlements north, east of the St. Lawrence Valley in what would become Canada until well after the war of independence. English early permanent settlements were St. John's, Newfoundland in 1630 and Halifax, Nova Scotia in 1749. The first permanent French settlement was in Quebec City, Quebec in 1608. In the British victory the Seven Years' War, France ceded to Britain its claims east of the Mississippi River in 1763. Spain gained rights to the territories west of Mississippi now acting as a border. French so-called "colonists" that had first settled the Illinois Country after several generations of experience on the new continent migrated over the Mississippi in the absence of Spanish occupants while leveraging earlier Louisiana French settlements around the Gulf of Mexico. These early French settlers partnering with midwest indigenous tribes and their mixed ancestry descendants would precede the westward push and guide through waves of followers all the way to the Pacific.

In the late 18th and early the Thirteen Colonies on the North Atlantic coast declared independence in 1776, fighting a protracted war of independence with the aid of Britain's enemies France and Spain, becoming the United States of America. The new nation steadily attempted to increase its territory. By that time, Russians were already well established on the Pacific Northwest northern coastline with Maritime Fur Trade activities supported by active settlements. As a result, Spanish were showing more interest in controlling the trade on the Pacific coast and mapped most of its coastline. The first Spanish settlements were attempted in Alta California during that period. Numerous overland explorations associated with Voyageurs, Fur Trade, and U.S. led expeditions (e.g., Lewis and Clark, Fremont and Wilkes) were reaching the Pacific at various latitudes around the turn of the century. In 1803 Napoleon Bonaparte sold France's remaining claims in North America, west of the Mississippi River, to the U.S., in a deal named the Louisiana Purchase. Spain and the U.S. settled their western boundary dispute in 1819 in the Adams–Onís Treaty. Mexico fought a lengthy war for independence from Spain, winning it for Mexico and Central American in 1821. The U.S. sought further westward expansion and fought the Mexican–American War, gaining a vast territory that first Spain and then Mexico claimed but which they did not effectively control. Much of the area was in fact dominated by indigenous peoples, which did not recognize the claims of Spain, France, or the U.S. Russia sold its North American claims, which included Alaska, to the U.S. in 1867. Also in 1867, settler colonies in eastern North America, were unified as the dominion of Canada. The U.S. sought to dig a canal across the Isthmus of Panama, a part of Colombia, and aided Panamanians in a war to separate it from Colombia. The U.S. carved out the Panama Canal Zone, over which it claimed sovereignty. After decades of work on the Panama Canal was completed, connecting the Atlantic and Pacific oceans in 1913.

Demographics

Economically, Canada and the U.S. are the wealthiest and most developed nations in the continent, followed by Mexico, a newly industrialized country. The countries of Central America and the Caribbean are at various levels of economic and human development. For example, small Caribbean island-nations, such as Barbados, Trinidad and Tobago, and Antigua and Barbuda, have a higher GDP (PPP) per capita than Mexico due to their smaller populations. Panama and Costa Rica have a significantly higher Human Development Index and GDP than the rest of the Central American nations. Additionally, despite Greenland's vast resources in oil and minerals, much of them remain untapped, and the island is economically dependent on fishing, tourism, and subsidies from Denmark. Nevertheless, the island is highly developed.

Demographically, North America is ethnically diverse. Its three main groups are Whites, Mestizos and Blacks. There is a significant minority of Indigenous Americans and Asians among other less numerous groups.

Languages 

The dominant languages in North America are English, Spanish, and French. Danish is prevalent in Greenland alongside Greenlandic, and Dutch is spoken side by side local languages in the Dutch Caribbean. The term Anglo-America is used to refer to the anglophone countries of the Americas: namely Canada (where English and French are co-official) and the U.S., but also sometimes Belize and parts of the tropics, especially the Commonwealth Caribbean. Latin America refers to the other areas of the Americas (generally south of the U.S.) where the Romance languages, derived from Latin, of Spanish and Portuguese, (but French-speaking countries are not usually included) predominate: the other republics of Central America (but not always Belize), part of the Caribbean (not the Dutch-, English-, or French-speaking areas), Mexico, and most of South America (except Guyana, Suriname, French Guiana [France], and the Falkland Islands [UK]).

The French language has historically played a significant role in North America and now retains a distinctive presence in some regions. Canada is officially bilingual. French is the official language of the Province of Quebec, where 95% of the people speak it as either their first or second language, and it is co-official with English in the Province of New Brunswick. Other French-speaking locales include the Province of Ontario (the official language is English, but there are an estimated 600,000 Franco-Ontarians), the Province of Manitoba (co-official as de jure with English), the French West Indies and Saint-Pierre et Miquelon, as well as the U.S. state of Louisiana, where French is also an official language. Haiti is included with this group based on historical association but Haitians speak both Creole and French. Similarly, French and French Antillean Creole is spoken in Saint Lucia and the Commonwealth of Dominica alongside English.

A significant number of Indigenous languages are spoken in North America, with 372,000 people in the U.S. speaking an indigenous language at home, about 225,000 in Canada and roughly 6 million in Mexico. In the U.S. and Canada, there are approximately 150 surviving indigenous languages of the 300 spoken prior to European contact.

Religions 

Christianity is the largest religion in the U.S., Canada and Mexico. According to a 2012 Pew Research Center survey, 77% of the population considered themselves Christians. Christianity also is the predominant religion in the 23 dependent territories in North America. The U.S. has the largest Christian population in the world, with nearly 247 million Christians (70%), although other countries have higher percentages of Christians among their populations. Mexico has the world's second largest number of Catholics, surpassed only by Brazil. A 2015 study estimates about 493,000 Christian believers from a Muslim background in North America, most of them belonging to some form of Protestantism.

According to the same study, the religiously unaffiliated (including agnostics and atheists) make up about 17% of the population of Canada and the U.S. Those with no religious affiliation make up about 24% of the U.S. population, and 24% of Canada's total population.

Canada, the U.S. and Mexico host communities of Jews (6 million or about 1.8%), Buddhists (3.8 million or 1.1%) and Muslims (3.4 million or 1.0%). The largest number of Jews can be found in the U.S. (5.4 million), Canada (375,000) and Mexico (67,476). The U.S. hosts the largest Muslim population in North America with 2.7 million or 0.9%, While Canada host about one million Muslim or 3.2% of the population. While in Mexico there were 3,700 Muslims in the country. In 2012, U-T San Diego estimated U.S. practitioners of Buddhism at 1.2 million people, of whom 40% are living in Southern California.

The predominant religion in Mexico and Central America is Christianity (96%). Beginning with the Spanish colonization of Mexico in the 16th century, Roman Catholicism was the only religion permitted by Spanish crown and Catholic church. A vast campaign of religious conversion, the so-called "spiritual conquest", was launched to bring indigenous into the Christian fold. The Inquisition was established to assure orthodox belief and practice. The Catholic Church remained an important institution, so that even after political independence, Roman Catholicism remained the dominant religion. Since the 1960s, there has been an increase in other Christian groups, particularly Protestantism, as well as other religious organizations, and individuals identifying themselves as having no religion. Also Christianity is the predominant religion in the Caribbean (85%). Other religious groups in the region are Hinduism, Islam, Rastafari (in Jamaica), and Afro-American religions such as Santería and Vodou.

Populace 

North America is the fourth most populous continent after Asia, Africa, and Europe. Its most populous country is the U.S. with 329.7 million persons. The second largest country is Mexico with a population of 112.3 million. Canada is the third most populous country with 37.0 million. The majority of Caribbean island-nations have national populations under a million, though Cuba, Dominican Republic, Haiti, Puerto Rico (a territory of the U.S.), Jamaica, and Trinidad and Tobago each have populations higher than a million. Greenland has a small population of 55,984 for its massive size (2,166,000 km2 or 836,300 mi2), and therefore, it has the world's lowest population density at 0.026 pop./km2 (0.067 pop./mi2).

While the U.S., Canada, and Mexico maintain the largest populations, large city populations are not restricted to those nations. There are also large cities in the Caribbean. The largest cities in North America, by far, are Mexico City and New York. These cities are the only cities on the continent to exceed eight million, and two of three in the Americas. Next in size are Los Angeles, Toronto, Chicago, Havana, Santo Domingo, and Montreal. Cities in the Sun Belt regions of the U.S., such as those in Southern California and Houston, Phoenix, Miami, Atlanta, and Las Vegas, are experiencing rapid growth. These causes included warm temperatures, retirement of Baby Boomers, large industry, and the influx of immigrants. Cities near the U.S. border, particularly in Mexico, are also experiencing large amounts of growth. Most notable is Tijuana, a city bordering San Diego that receives immigrants from all over Latin America and parts of Europe and Asia. Yet as cities grow in these warmer regions of North America, they are increasingly forced to deal with the major issue of water shortages.

Eight of the top ten metropolitan areas are located in the U.S. These metropolitan areas all have a population of above 5.5 million and include the New York City metropolitan area, Los Angeles metropolitan area, Chicago metropolitan area, and the Dallas–Fort Worth metroplex. Whilst the majority of the largest metropolitan areas are within the U.S., Mexico is host to the largest metropolitan area by population in North America: Greater Mexico City. Canada also breaks into the top ten largest metropolitan areas with the Toronto metropolitan area having six million people. The proximity of cities to each other on the Canada–U.S. border and Mexico–U.S. border has led to the rise of international metropolitan areas. These urban agglomerations are observed at their largest and most productive in Detroit–Windsor and San Diego–Tijuana and experience large commercial, economic, and cultural activity. The metropolitan areas are responsible for millions of dollars of trade dependent on international freight. In Detroit-Windsor the Border Transportation Partnership study in 2004 concluded US$13 billion was dependent on the Detroit–Windsor international border crossing while in San Diego-Tijuana freight at the Otay Mesa Port of Entry was valued at US$20 billion.

North America has also been witness to the growth of megapolitan areas. In the U.S. exists eleven megaregions that transcend international borders and comprise Canadian and Mexican metropolitan regions. These are the Arizona Sun Corridor, Cascadia, Florida, Front Range, Great Lakes Megalopolis, Gulf Coast, Northeast, Northern California, Piedmont Atlantic, Southern California, and the Texas Triangle. Canada and Mexico are also the home of megaregions. These include the Quebec City–Windsor Corridor, Golden Horseshoe—both of which are considered part of the Great Lakes Megalopolis—and the Central Mexico megalopolis. Traditionally the largest megaregion has been considered the Boston-Washington, DC Corridor, or the Northeast, as the region is one massive contiguous area. Yet megaregion criterion have allowed the Great Lakes Megalopolis to maintain status as the most populated region, being home to 53,768,125 people in 2000.

The top ten largest North American metropolitan areas by population as of 2013, based on national census numbers from the U.S. and census estimates from Canada and Mexico.

†2011 Census figures

Economy 

North America's GDP per capita was evaluated in October 2016 by the International Monetary Fund (IMF) to be $41,830, making it the richest continent in the world, followed by Oceania.

Canada, Mexico, and the U.S. have significant and multifaceted economic systems. The U.S. has the largest economy of all three countries and in the world. In 2016, the U.S. had an estimated per capita gross domestic product (PPP) of $57,466 according to the World Bank, and is the most technologically developed economy of the three. The U.S.'s services sector comprises 77% of the country's GDP (estimated in 2010), industry comprises 22% and agriculture comprises 1.2%. The U.S. economy is also the fastest growing economy in North America and the Americas as a whole, with the highest GDP per capita in the Americas as well.

Canada shows significant growth in the sectors of services, mining and manufacturing. Canada's per capita GDP (PPP) was estimated at $44,656 and it had the 11th largest GDP (nominal) in 2014. Canada's services sector comprises 78% of the country's GDP (estimated in 2010), industry comprises 20% and agriculture comprises 2%. Mexico has a per capita GDP (PPP) of $16,111 and as of 2014 is the 15th largest GDP (nominal) in the world. Being a newly industrialized country, Mexico maintains both modern and outdated industrial and agricultural facilities and operations. Its main sources of income are oil, industrial exports, manufactured goods, electronics, heavy industry, automobiles, construction, food, banking and financial services.

The North American economy is well defined and structured in three main economic areas. These areas are those under the North American Free Trade Agreement (NAFTA), the Caribbean Community and Common Market (CARICOM), and the Central American Common Market (CACM). Of these trade blocs, the U.S. takes part in two. In addition to the larger trade blocs there is the Canada-Costa Rica Free Trade Agreement among numerous other free-trade relations, often between the larger, more developed countries and Central American and Caribbean countries.

The NAFTA forms one of the four largest trade blocs in the world. Its implementation in 1994 was designed for economic homogenization with hopes of eliminating barriers of trade and foreign investment between Canada, the U.S. and Mexico. While Canada and the U.S. already conducted the largest bilateral trade relationship—and to present day still do—in the world and Canada–U.S. trade relations already allowed trade without national taxes and tariffs, NAFTA allowed Mexico to experience a similar duty-free trade. The free-trade agreement allowed for the elimination of tariffs that had previously been in place on U.S.–Mexico trade. Trade volume has steadily increased annually and in 2010, surface trade between the three NAFTA nations reached an all-time historical increase of 24.3% or US$791 billion. The NAFTA trade bloc GDP (PPP) is the world's largest with US$17.617 trillion. This is in part attributed to the fact that the economy of the U.S. is the world's largest national economy; the country had a nominal GDP of approximately $14.7 trillion in 2010. The countries of NAFTA are also some of each other's largest trade partners. The U.S. is the largest trade partner of Canada and Mexico, while Canada and Mexico are each other's third largest trade partners. In 2018, the NAFTA was replaced by the U.S.–Mexico–Canada Agreement.

The Caribbean trade bloc (CARICOM) came into agreement in 1973 when it was signed by 15 Caribbean nations. As of 2000, CARICOM trade volume was US$96 billion. CARICOM also allowed for the creation of a common passport for associated nations. In the past decade the trade bloc focused largely on free-trade agreements and under the CARICOM Office of Trade Negotiations free-trade agreements have been signed into effect.

Integration of Central American economies occurred under the signing of the Central American Common Market agreement in 1961; this was the first attempt to engage the nations of this area into stronger financial cooperation. The 2006 implementation of the Central American Free Trade Agreement (CAFTA) left the future of the CACM unclear. The Central American Free Trade Agreement was signed by five Central American countries, the Dominican Republic, and the U.S. The focal point of CAFTA is to create a free trade area similar to that of NAFTA. In addition to the U.S., Canada also has relations in Central American trade blocs.

These nations also take part in inter-continental trade blocs. Mexico takes a part in the G3 Free Trade Agreement with Colombia and Venezuela and has a trade agreement with the EU. The U.S. has proposed and maintained trade agreements under the Transatlantic Free Trade Area between itself and the European Union; the U.S.–Middle East Free Trade Area between numerous Middle Eastern nations and itself; and the Trans-Pacific Strategic Economic Partnership between Southeast Asian nations, Australia, and New Zealand.

Transport 

No definitive length of the Pan-American Highway exists because the U.S. and Canadian governments have never officially defined any specific routes as being part of the Pan-American Highway, and Mexico officially has many branches connecting to the U.S. border.

The First Transcontinental Railroad in the U.S. was built in the 1860s, linking the railroad network of the eastern U.S. with California on the Pacific coast. Finished on 10 May 1869 at the famous golden spike event at Promontory Summit, Utah, it created a nationwide mechanized transportation network that revolutionized the population and economy of the American West, catalyzing the transition from the wagon trains of previous decades to a modern transportation system. Although an accomplishment, it achieved the status of first transcontinental railroad by connecting myriad eastern U.S. railroads to the Pacific and was not the largest single railroad system in the world.

Communications 
A shared telephone system known as the North American Numbering Plan (NANP) is an integrated telephone numbering plan of 24 countries and territories: the U.S. and its territories, Canada, Bermuda, and 17 Caribbean nations.

Culture 

The cultures of North America are diverse. The U.S. and English Canada have many cultural similarities, while French Canada has a distinct culture from Anglophone Canada, which is protected by law. Since the U.S. was formed from portions previously part of the Spanish Empire and then independent Mexico, and there has been considerable and continuing immigration of Spanish speakers from south of the U.S.–Mexico border. In the southwest of the U.S. there are many Hispanic cultural traditions and considerable bilingualism. Mexico and Central America are part of Latin America and are culturally distinct from anglophone and francophone North America. However, they share with the United States the establishment of post-independence governments that are federated representative republics with written constitutions dating from their founding as nations. Canada is a federated parliamentary democracy under a constitutional monarchy.

Canada's constitution dates to 1867, with confederation, in the British North America Act, but not until 1982 did Canada have the power to amend its own constitution. Canada's Francophone heritage has been enshrined in law since the British parliament passed the Quebec Act of 1774. In contrast to largely Protestant Anglo settlers in North America, French-speaking Canadians were Catholic and with the Quebec Act were guaranteed freedom to practice their religion, restored the right of the Catholic Church to impose tithes for its support, and established French civil law in most circumstances.

The distinctiveness of French language and culture has been codified in Canadian law, so that both English and French are designated official languages.  The U.S. has no official language, but its national language is English.

The Canadian government took action to protect Canadian culture by limiting non-Canadian content in broadcasting, creating the Canadian Radio and Telecommunications Commission to monitor Canadian content. In Quebec, the provincial government established the Quebec Office of the French Language, often called the "language police" by Anglophones, which mandates the use of French terminology and signage in French. Since 1968 the unicameral legislature has been called the Quebec National Assembly. Saint-Jean-Baptiste Day, 24 June, is the national holiday of Quebec and celebrated by francophone Canadians throughout Canada. In Quebec, the school system was divided into Catholic and Protestant, so-called confessional schools. Anglophone education in Quebec has been increasingly undermined.

Latino culture is strong in the southwest of the U.S., as well as Florida, which draws Latin Americans from many countries in the hemisphere.  Northern Mexico, particularly in the cities of Monterrey, Tijuana, Ciudad Juárez, and Mexicali, is strongly influenced by the culture and way of life of the U.S. Monterrey, a modern city with a significant industrial group, has been regarded as the most Americanized city in Mexico. Northern Mexico, the Western U.S. and Alberta, Canada share a cowboy culture.

The Anglophone Caribbean states have witnessed and participated in the decline of the British Empire and its influence on the region, and its replacement by the economic influence of Northern America in the Anglophone Caribbean. This is partly due to the relatively small populations of the English-speaking Caribbean countries, and also because many of them now have more people living abroad than those remaining at home.

Greenland has experienced many immigration waves from Northern Canada, e .g. the Thule people. Therefore, Greenland shares some cultural ties with the indigenous peoples of Canada. Greenland is also considered Nordic and has strong Danish ties due to centuries of colonization by Denmark.

Popular culture – sports 
The U.S. and Canada have major sports teams that compete against each other, including baseball, basketball, hockey, and soccer/football.
Canada, Mexico and the U.S. submitted a joint bid to host the 2026 FIFA World Cup.
The following table shows the most prominent sports leagues in North America, in order of average revenue. Canada has a separate Canadian Football League from the U.S. teams.

The Native American game of lacrosse is considered a national sport in Canada. Curling is an important winter sport in Canada, and the Winter Olympics includes it in the roster. The English sport of cricket is popular in parts of anglophone Canada and very popular in parts of the former British empire, but in Canada is considered a minor sport. Boxing is also a major sport in some countries, such as Mexico, Panama and Puerto Rico, and it's considered one of the main individual sports in the U.S.

See also 
 Flags of North America
 List of cities in North America
 North American Union
 Outline of North America
 Table manners in North America

References

Footnotes

Citations

Further reading

External links 
    
     
 North America: Human Geography at the National Geographic Society 
 European Colonization of North America at the National Geographic Society 
      
  
 The Columbia Gazetteer of the World Online Columbia University Press 
  
 

 

 
Continents